The 1892 United States presidential election in North Carolina took place on November 8, 1892. All contemporary 44 states were part of the 1892 United States presidential election. North Carolina voters chose 11 electors to the Electoral College, which selected the president and vice president.

North Carolina was won by the Democratic nominees, former President Grover Cleveland of New York and his running mate Adlai Stevenson I of Illinois.

Results

Results by county

Notes

References

North Carolina
1892
1892 North Carolina elections